Shiva Advaita (Devanagari:शिवाद्वैत), also known as  or Shaivite qualified nondualism  is a Shaivite school of philosophy from Southern India that was founded by Srikanta Sivacharya during the eighth century and followed mostly by Veerashaivas. According to this doctrine, the Shiva and the Brahman are the one and the same.

Srikanta Sivacharya (also known as Nilakantha Sivacharya) wrote a commentary on Brahma Sutras, which became known as Śiva Viśiṣṭādvaita. The time-frame of Srikanta's work is not exactly known, but believed to be somewhere between 12th and 14th century. The theory of Śiva Viśiṣṭādvaita follows very closely Ramanuja's Viśiṣṭādvaita non-dualism doctrine, but differs in who is considered Supreme. Srikanta considers Shiva supreme. It is not known whether Srikanta Sivacharya's work was completed before or after Ramanuja's. Sri Appayya Dikshita contributed further to Shiva Advaita by expounding Srikanta's philosophy in his Sivarka mani dipika. Srikanta does not deny nirguna Brahman, which is central to Advaita. In contrast to Srikanta, who considers his Brahma Sutra Bhasya Viśiṣṭādvaita (qualified non-dualism), which affirms the supremacy of saguna Brahman, Appayya affirms a form of pure non-dualism and recasting Srikanta's work in an effort to establish Shiva Advaita in his Śivādvaitanirṇaya.

References

Hindu philosophy
Advaita
Shaivism
Schools and traditions in ancient Indian philosophy
Advaita Shaivism